Ballet Magnificat! is a professional Christian ballet company founded in Mississippi in 1986 and located in the state capital, Jackson. It has been described as the premiere Christian dance company in the United States, and has spawned numerous dance companies and ministries. The 501(c)(3) non-profit ministry consists of a full-time touring company, pre-professional training program, school of the arts, Summer Dance Intensive, Jr. Dance Intensive, and Brazil satellite company and school.

Founder and Artistic Director Kathy Thibodeaux was the 1982 silver medalist at the USA International Ballet Competition (held every four years in Jackson, Mississippi). Founder and Executive Director Keith Thibodeaux is a former child actor, best known for portraying “Little Ricky” on the I Love Lucy TV show and drumming for the groundbreaking Christian rock band David and the Giants.

The company's base, Jackson, is the same city as the USA International Ballet Competition.

It is the nation's first professional Christian dance company. It is now considered the benchmark for professional Christian dance around the world, and is credited for its role in restoring dance as a form of worship in the church.

Touring company 
Composed of 15 dancers on average, the touring company performs nationally and internationally throughout the year. Their performances are hosted by local sponsors and take place in theaters, universities, churches, and schools. Once or twice a year, the company travels overseas and performs to sold-out audiences. They have performed in over 43 countries. A second professional touring company was added in 2004, Ballet Magnificat! Omega, which toured extensively throughout the US and abroad from 2004 to 2019, merging with the original Alpha Company in August 2019.

Trainee program 
The pre-professional training program began in 1996 with three dancers, and today has grown to three levels at the Jackson base. This program feeds dancers into the touring company, and provides training and preparation for work in other ministries and dance companies. The program's events company consists of the most advanced level and travels worldwide throughout the year. The trainee program is recognized by the U.S. Immigration Service as a vocational school, and draws students from across the U.S. and many foreign countries each year.

School of the arts 
In 1989 the ministry opened a school of the arts in Jackson, which offers dance classes to area students ages 3 through adult.

Brazil satellite 
Curitiba, Brazil, became home to the first satellite of Ballet Magnificat! in February 2017, beginning with a professional training program and growing to include a performance company and school of the arts.

Choreographers 
In addition to Kathy Thibodeaux, Ballet Magnificat! has depended greatly on former resident choreographer Jiri Sebastian Voborsky (1994–2021), and guest choreographer Tara Thibodeaux Drew, to keep the company's repertoire fresh and innovative.

Repertoire 

Ballet Magnificat! performs only original works, unusual in the dance world, with most being full-length story ballets.

 Even in the Why (2020)
 A Christmas Carol, the ballet (2019)
 Snow Queen Returns (2018) 
 Heaven Come Down (2017)
 Light Has Come (2016)
 Hosea (2015)
 Prodigal's Journey – two-act version (2015) 
 Face 2 Face (2013)                      
 Stratagem (2013)
 Most Incredible Christmas (2012)
 Snow Queen (2011)
 The Arrival (2011)
 Before His Throne (2008)
 Scarlet Cord (2008)
 A Christmas Dream (2006)
 Hiding Place (2006)
 Ruth (2005)
 Journey of the Prodigal Son (2003)
 Selah (2003)
 Freedom (2002)                                                     
 Deliver Us (2001)
 Give Me Jesus (2000) 
 Emmanuel (2000)
 Basic Instructions (1999)
 Psalms, Hymns, & Spiritual Songs (1997) 
 Unveiled Hope (1997)
 Poiema (1997) 
 Lord Of All (1997)
 Saviour (1996)
 Known by the Scars (1996)
 God Gets the Glory (1995)
 Veni, Sancte, Spiritus (1994)
 God will Make a Way (1993) 
 Sanctuary (1992)
 God of Life (1992)
 Praise Magnificat ( 1992)
 My Father’s World (1991)
 Forever Changed ( 1991)
 A Christmas Festival (1991)
 Thy Kingdom Come (1989)
 Joy (1989)
 Light Eternal (1989) 
 Regathering (1988)
 Hebrew (1988)
 Doulos (1988)
 The Calling (1987)
 Creation (1987)
 Painter (1986)
 Sandi Songs (1986)
 Bach (1986)

References

Dance in Mississippi
Magnificat!, Ballet
Christian organizations based in the United States
Performing groups established in 1986
1986 establishments in Mississippi